Accepted species of Nicotiana include;

 Nicotiana acaulis Speg.
 Nicotiana acuminata (Graham) Hook. – manyflower tobacco
 Nicotiana africana Merxm.
 Nicotiana alata Link & Otto – jasmine tobacco, sweet tobacco, winged tobacco, Persian tobacco, tanbaku (Persian)
 Nicotiana ameghinoi Speg.
 Nicotiana amplexicaulis N. T. Burb.
 Nicotiana arentsii Goodsp.
 Nicotiana attenuata Torrey ex S. Watson – coyote tobacco
 Nicotiana azambujae L. B. Smith & Downs
 Nicotiana benavidesii Goodsp.
 Nicotiana benthamiana Domin – benth, benthi
 Nicotiana bonariensis Lehm.
 Nicotiana burbidgeae Symon
 Nicotiana cavicola N. T. Burb.
 Nicotiana clevelandii A. Gray – Cleveland's tobacco
 Nicotiana cordifolia Phil.
 Nicotiana corymbosa J. Rémy
 Nicotiana cutleri D'Arcy
 Nicotiana excelsior (J. M. Black) J. M. Black
 Nicotiana forgetiana Hemsl.
 Nicotiana forsteri Roem. & Schult. (previously designated N. debneyi) 
 Nicotiana fragrans Hooker
 Nicotiana glauca Graham – tree tobacco, Brazilian tree tobacco, shrub tobacco, wild tobacco, tobacco plant, tobacco bush, tobacco tree, mustard tree
 Nicotiana glutinosa L.
 Nicotiana goodspeedii H.-M. Wheeler
 Nicotiana gossei Domin
 Nicotiana hesperis N. T. Burb.
 Nicotiana heterantha Kenneally & Symon
 Nicotiana ingulba J. M. Black
 Nicotiana kawakamii Y. Ohashi
 Nicotiana knightiana Goodsp.
 Nicotiana langsdorffii Weinm. – Langsdorff's tobacco
 Nicotiana linearis Phil.
 Nicotiana longibracteata Phil.
 Nicotiana longiflora Cav. – longflower tobacco, long-flowered tobacco
 Nicotiana maritima H.-M. Wheeler
 Nicotiana megalosiphon Van Huerck & Müll. Arg.
 Nicotiana miersii J. Rémy
 Nicotiana mutabilis Stehmann & Samir
 Nicotiana nesophila I. M. Johnston
 Nicotiana noctiflora Hook.
 Nicotiana nudicaulis S. Watson
 Nicotiana occidentalis H.-M. Wheeler – native tobacco
 Nicotiana obtusifolia M. Martens & Galeotti (previously designated N. trigonophylla) – desert tobacco, punche, "tabaquillo"
 Nicotiana otophora Griseb.
 Nicotiana paa Mart. Crov.
 Nicotiana palmeri A. Gray
 Nicotiana paniculata L. – small-flowered tobacco
 Nicotiana pauciflora J. Rémy 
 Nicotiana petuniodes (Griseb.) Millán.
 Nicotiana plumbaginifolia Viv. – Tex-Mex tobacco
 Nicotiana quadrivalvis Pursh (replaces the following older classifications: N. multivalvis Lindl., N. plumbaginifolia Viv. var. bigelovii Torrey, N. bigelovii (Torrey) S. Watson) – Indian tobacco
 Nicotiana raimondii J. F. Macbr.
 Nicotiana repanda Willd. – fiddleleaf tobacco
 Nicotiana rotundifolia Lindl.
 Nicotiana rustica L. – Aztec tobacco, strong tobacco, mapacho
 Nicotiana setchellii Goodsp.
 Nicotiana simulans N. T. Burb.
 Nicotiana solanifolia Walp.
 Nicotiana spegazzinii Millán
 Nicotiana stenocarpa H.-M. Wheeler
 Nicotiana stocktonii Brandegee
 Nicotiana suaveolens Lehm. – Australian tobacco
 Nicotiana sylvestris Speg. & Comes – woodland tobacco, flowering tobacco, South American tobacco
 Nicotiana tabacum L. – common tobacco, domesticated tobacco, cultivated tobacco, commercial tobacco (grown for the production of cigars, cigarillos, cigarettes, chewing tobacco, dipping tobacco, snuff, snus, etc.)
 Nicotiana thrysiflora Bitter ex Goodsp.
 Nicotiana tomentosa Ruiz & Pav.
 Nicotiana tomentosiformis Goodsp.
 Nicotiana truncata D. E. Symon
 Nicotiana umbratica N. T. Burb.
 Nicotiana undulata Ruiz & Pav.
 Nicotiana velutina H.-M. Wheeler
 Nicotiana wigandioides Koch & Fintelm.
 Nicotiana wuttkei Clarkson & Symon

Additional species listed by APNI are:
 Nicotiana gascoynica M.W. Chase & Christenh.
 Nicotiana hoskingii M.W. Chase, Palsson & Christenh.
 Nicotiana insecticida M.W. Chase & Christenh.
 Nicotiana karijini M.W. Chase & Christenh.
 Nicotiana yandinga M.W. Chase & christenh.

References 

List
Nicotiana